Pak Ngan Heung is a village of Mui Wo, on Lantau Island, Hong Kong.

Administration
Pak Ngan Heung is a recognized village under the New Territories Small House Policy.

Features
A temple dedicated to Man Mo is located in Pak Ngan Heung. Probably built before 1901, it is said to have been originally built during the reign of Wanli, emperor of the Ming dynasty (1573–1620). The temple underwent a major renovation in 1960 and was rebuilt in 2001. It is not a graded historic building.

References

External links

 Delineation of area of existing village Pak Ngan Heung (Mui Wo) for election of resident representative (2019 to 2022)
 Antiquities and Monuments Office. Pictures of Man Mo Temple, Pak Ngan Heung, Mui Wo

Villages in Islands District, Hong Kong
Mui Wo